Gompholobium ecostatum, commonly known as dwarf wedge-pea, is a species of flowering plant in the family Fabaceae and is endemic to southern Australia. It is a low-lying to erect shrub with trifoliate leaves with linear to lance-shaped leaflets, and apricot-coloured to reddish, sometimes yellow flowers.

Description

Taxonomy
Gompholobium ecostatum was first formally described in 1965 by Rex Harold Kuchel in the Supplement to J.M.Black's Flora of South Australia (Second Edition, 1943-1957). The specific epithet (ecostatum) means "without ribs".

Distribution and habitat
Dwarf wedge-pea grows in heathland and woodland in southern Victoria from near Wilsons Promontory to Kangaroo Island in South Australia and inland as far as the Little Desert National Park. It also occurs on Flinders Island in Tasmania.

Conservation status
This pea is classified as "endangered" under the Tasmanian Government Threatened Species Protection Act 1995.

References

Mirbelioids
ecostatum
Flora of South Australia
Flora of Victoria (Australia)
Flora of Tasmania
Plants described in 1965